The Rio Mesa Solar Electric Generating Facility was a proposed  solar thermal power project in Riverside County, California. The developers for the project were subsidiaries of BrightSource Energy, Inc. 
The plant was expected to cost about $2 billion.

About 170,000 heliostats would have reflected sunlight to the receivers mounted on top of the  towers. 

In December 2011, the California Energy Commission (CEC) accepted the application for certification for the Rio Mesa SEGF. 
In October 2012, Rio Mesa received preliminary approval from the CEC; final approval was needed by June 2013 to fulfill its PPA. 
However, the discovery of a large deposit of Pleistocene fossils underlying part of the project's area delayed approval or construction.
In January 2013, BrightSource suspended the Rio Mesa project; the project was formally cancelled in July 2013.

References

External links

 
 

Solar power stations in California
Proposed solar power stations in the United States